Goss Moor is a national nature reserve in Cornwall, England,  south-west of Bodmin in the parishes of St Dennis, St Columb Major, Roche and St Enoder. It is the largest continuous mire complex in south-west Britain and consists of mainly peatland and lowland heath. Together with the neighbouring moor to the east, it forms the Goss And Tregoss Moors Site of Special Scientific Interest (SSSI), as well as the Breney Common and Goss and Tregoss Moors Special Area of Conservation (SAC).

History
Before 1838, Davies Gilbert wrote that the flat country round it (St Dennis) is destroyed in the most efficacious manner, having been turned over and over again down to the solid rock, in what is termed streaming for tin. Between 1908 and 1916 steam powered suction and cutter dredges were used for the mining of alluvial tin on the moor. Drilling took place in 1908 and 1909 but the position of the boreholes and what they contained have been lost. Approximately 70 tons of tin concentrate was extracted and the dredges were later moved to Breney Common, Molinnis and Red Moor. The area was designated as the Goss and Tregoss Moors Site of Special Scientific Interest in 1988.

Matthew Taylor, who had been Member of Parliament for Truro and St Austell from 1987 to 2010, chose the title Baron Taylor of Goss Moor when he was appointed a life peer in the 2010 Dissolution Honours.

Geography
The River Fal rises on the moor at Pentivale and flows  to the English Channel at Carrick Roads. The A30 road once ran through the middle of Goss Moor. This was a major bottleneck for traffic and had been subject to a long running campaign for expansion which was strongly opposed. In late 2004 a decision was finally reached and the dual carriageway running to the north of moor was opened on 25 June 2007. Much of the existing road is now converted to a cycle lane which opened on 11 May 2008. The Atlantic Coast railway line between Par and Newquay also crosses Goss Moor.

Scarce or rare species
It is home to a number of scarce and rare species including:
plants yellow centaury (Cicendia filiformis), marsh clubmoss.
invertebrates small red and variable  damselfly.
butterflies silver-studded blue, marsh fritillary, small pearl-bordered fritillary, grizzled skipper
moths narrow-bordered bee hawk and double line.

A 2003 study found twelve different poor fen sub-communities.

References

External links

 National Nature Reserve (Natural England).
 Hydrology (University of Plymouth).

Cornish Killas
Moorlands of Cornwall
National nature reserves in Cornwall
Sites of Special Scientific Interest in Cornwall
Sites of Special Scientific Interest notified in 1988
Special Areas of Conservation in Cornwall